James Templer (born 8 January 1936) is a British equestrian. He competed in two events at the 1964 Summer Olympics.

References

1936 births
Living people
British male equestrians
Olympic equestrians of Great Britain
Equestrians at the 1964 Summer Olympics
Place of birth missing (living people)